Àlex Corretja was the defending champion, but lost in the first round to Andrew Ilie.

Jérôme Golmard won the title, defeating Nicolas Kiefer 6–4, 6–2 in the final.

Seeds

Draw

Finals

Top half

Bottom half

References

 Main Draw

1999 Dubai Tennis Championships
1999 ATP Tour